The White River State Trail is a 19-mile state designated rail trail in Racine and Walworth Counties in Wisconsin.

Route
The trail follows a former rail corridor between Elkhorn, Wisconsin and Dover, Wisconsin. The trail begins at County Highway H in Elkhorn, Wisconsin, and travels east to Vandenboom Road in Dover, Wisconsin. The trail is 19 miles long, with a two-mile gap in Burlington, Wisconsin. The trail is made of crushed limestone.

Access
The trail is open to walkers, joggers, bicyclists in the summer, and snowmobiling, cross-country skiing, and snowshoeing in the winter.

The trail is free to walk or run, but a trail pass must be purchased in order to bike the trail, which may be purchased at several self-registration stations along the trail.

References

External links
Official website

Hiking trails in Wisconsin
Rail trails in Wisconsin
Protected areas of Racine County, Wisconsin
Protected areas of Walworth County, Wisconsin